The Municipal Borough of Hornsey was a local government district in east Middlesex from 1867 to 1965.

History
In 1867, a Local Board was formed for part of the civil parish of Hornsey. The rest of the parish was already under South Hornsey Local Board, formed in 1865.

In 1894, under the Local Government Act of that year, Hornsey became an urban district. In November 1903, it was incorporated as a municipal borough. The corporation made two unsuccessful attempts to gain county borough status in 1904 and 1915. The borough was part of the London postal district and Metropolitan Police District.

The borough's coat of arms, granted in 1904, featured two oak trees recalling the ancient forest that once covered the area and surviving remnants including Queen's Wood, Highgate Wood and Coldfall Wood. The manor of Hornsey had at one time been held by the Diocese of London and crossed swords, taken from the Diocese's arms, completed the design.

One of the municipal borough's first significant projects was the opening of Hornsey Cottage Hospital in 1910. Hornsey Town Hall, built in 1933–35 and designed by Reginald Uren, was widely admired for its clean, Modernist style and beautiful detailing, symbolising enlightened local government. However, since 2004 Haringey Council gradually removed municipal services from the building, and its increasing dereliction caused a local furore.

In 1965, the municipal borough was abolished and its area was transferred to Greater London under the London Government Act 1963. Hornsey's area was combined with the Municipal Borough of Tottenham and the Municipal Borough of Wood Green to form the present-day London Borough of Haringey.

References

External links 
A Vision of Britain - Hornsey UD/MB

Districts abolished by the London Government Act 1963
Districts of England created by the Local Government Act 1894
Local Government Districts created by the Local Government Act 1858
History of the London Borough of Haringey
History of local government in London (1889–1965)
Municipal boroughs of England
History of local government in Middlesex
Municipal Borough of